Telegin (from telega, a type of horse-drawn vehicle) is a Russian masculine surname; its feminine counterpart is Telegina. It may refer to:

Angelina Telegina (born 1992), Russian ice dancer
Dmitri Telegin (born 1992), Russian football player
Ilya Telegin (born 1981), Uzbekistani football player
Ivan Telegin (born 1992), Russian ice hockey player
Konstantin Telegin (1899–1981), Soviet general 
Sergei Telegin (born 2000), Russian ice hockey player

Russian-language surnames